Estonia participated in the Eurovision Song Contest 2014 with the song "Amazing" written by Timo Vendt and Tatjana Mihhailova. The song was performed by Tanja. The Estonian broadcaster Eesti Rahvusringhääling (ERR) organised the national final Eesti Laul 2014 in order to select the Estonian entry for the 2014 contest in Copenhagen, Denmark. The national final consisted of three shows: two semi-finals and a final. Ten songs competed in each semi-final and the top five from each semi-final as determined by a jury panel and public vote qualified to the final. In the final, the winner was selected over two rounds of voting. In the first round, a jury panel and a public vote selected the top two to qualify to the superfinal. In the superfinal, "Amazing" performed by Tanja was selected as the winner entirely by a public vote.

Estonia was drawn to compete in the first semi-final of the Eurovision Song Contest which took place on 6 May 2014. Performing during the show in position 3, "Amazing" was not announced among the top 10 entries of the first semi-final and therefore did not qualify to compete in the final. It was later revealed that Estonia placed twelfth out of the 16 participating countries in the semi-final with 36 points.

Background 

In 2013, "Et uus saaks alguse" performed by Birgit managed to qualify Estonia to the final where the song placed twentieth.

The Estonian national broadcaster, Eesti Rahvusringhääling (ERR), broadcasts the event within Estonia and organises the selection process for the nation's entry. ERR confirmed Estonia's participation at the 2014 Eurovision Song Contest on 18 July 2013. Since their debut, the Estonian broadcaster has organised national finals that feature a competition among multiple artists and songs in order to select Estonia's entry for the Eurovision Song Contest. The Eesti Laul competition has been organised since 2009 in order to select Estonia's entry and on 2 October 2013, ERR announced the organisation of Eesti Laul 2014 in order to select the nation's 2014 entry.

Before Eurovision

Eesti Laul 2014 
Eesti Laul 2014 was the sixth edition of the Estonian national selection Eesti Laul, which selected Estonia's entry for the Eurovision Song Contest 2014. The competition consisted of twenty entries competing in two semi-finals on 14 and 21 February 2014 leading to a ten-song final on 1 March 2014. All three shows were broadcast on Eesti Televisioon (ETV) as well as streamed online at the broadcaster's official website err.ee. The final was also broadcast via radio on Raadio 2 as well as streamed online at the official Eurovision Song Contest website eurovision.tv.

Format 
The format of the competition included two semi-finals on 14 and 21 February 2014 and a final on 1 March 2014. Ten songs competed in each semi-final and the top five from each semi-final qualified to complete the ten song lineup in the final. The results of the semi-finals was determined by the 50/50 combination of votes from a professional jury and public televoting. The winning song in the final was selected over two rounds of voting: the first round results selected the top two songs via the 50/50 combination of jury and public voting, while the second round (superfinal) determined the winner solely by public televoting.

Competing entries 
On 2 October 2013, ERR opened the submission period for artists and composers to submit their entries up until 9 December 2013. All artists and composers were required to have Estonian citizenship or be a permanent resident of Estonia and each artist and songwriter was only able to submit a maximum of three entries. A record 189 submissions were received by the deadline—breaking the previous record of 159, set during the 2012 edition. An 11-member jury panel selected 20 semi-finalists from the submissions and the selected songs were announced during the ETV entertainment program Ringvaade on 12 December 2013. The selection jury consisted of Maarja-Liis Ilus (singer), Janek Murd (musician), Erik Morna (Raadio 2 head of music), Siim Nestor (music critic), Kaupo Karelson (television producer), Valner Valme (music critic), Tauno Aints (composer), Ingrid Kohtla (Tallinn Music Week organiser), Owe Petersell (Raadio Elmar chief editor), Toomas Puna (Raadio Sky+ program director) and Kostja Tsõbulevski (musician).

Among the competing artists were previous Eurovision Song Contest entrants Lauri Pihlap, who represented Estonia as member of 2XL in 2001 together with Tanel Padar and Dave Benton, Lenna, who represented Switzerland in 2005 as member of the band Vanilla Ninja, and Sandra Nurmsalu, who represented Estonia in 2009 as part of the group Urban Symphony. August Hunt, Kõrsikud, Liisi Koikson (MiaMee), Maiken, Norman Salumäe, Sofia Rubina, Traffic and Tuuli Rand (lead singer of Vöörad) have all competed in previous editions of Eesti Laul.

Semi-finals
Two semi-finals took place on 14 and 21 February 2014, hosted by Helen Sürje and Henrik Kalmet with additional commentary provided by Indrek Vaheoja in both semi-finals, Peeter Oja in the first semi-final, and Mart Juur in the second semi-final. The live portion of the shows was held at the ERR studios in Tallinn where the artists awaited the results while their performances, which were filmed earlier at the ERR studios between 6 and 9 February 2014, were screened.

In each semi-final ten songs competed for five spots in the final with the outcome decided upon by the combination of the votes from a jury panel and a public televote. The jury panel that voted in the semi-finals consisted of Nele-Liis Vaiksoo, Valner Valme, Anna Põldvee, Olav Osolin, Heini Vaikmaa, Mart Niineste, Erik Morna, Owe Petersell, Els Himma, Liis Lemsalu and Tauno Aints.

Final
The final took place on 1 March 2014 at the Nokia Concert Hall in Tallinn, hosted by Marko Reikop and Henrik Kalmet. The five entries that qualified from each of the two preceding semi-finals, all together ten songs, competed during the show. The winner was selected over two rounds of voting. In the first round, a jury (50%) and public televote (50%) determined the top two entries to proceed to the superfinal. In the superfinal, "Amazing" performed by Tanja was selected as the winner entirely by a public televote. The public vote in the first round registered 52,190 votes, and the vote in the superfinal registered 57,272 votes. In addition to the performances of the competing entries, Ott Lepland, who represented Estonia in the Eurovision Song Contest 2012, and Birgit Õigemeel, who represented Estonia in the Eurovision Song Contest 2013, performed as the interval act. The jury panel that voted in the first round of the final consisted of Maarja-Liis Ilus (singer), Erki Pärnoja (musician), Rolf Roosalu (singer), Getter Jaani (singer), Siim Nestor (music critic), Ott Lepland (singer), Koit Raudsepp (Raadio 2 presenter), Els Himma (singer), Leslie Da Bass (musician), Siiri Sisask (musician) and Tõnis Mägi (singer).

At Eurovision

According to Eurovision rules, all nations with the exceptions of the host country and the "Big Five" (France, Germany, Italy, Spain and the United Kingdom) are required to qualify from one of two semi-finals in order to compete for the final; the top ten countries from each semi-final progress to the final. The European Broadcasting Union (EBU) split up the competing countries into six different pots based on voting patterns from previous contests, with countries with favourable voting histories put into the same pot. On 20 January 2014, a special allocation draw was held which placed each country into one of the two semi-finals, as well as which half of the show they would perform in. Estonia was placed into the first semi-final, to be held on 6 May 2014, and was scheduled to perform in the first half of the show.

Once all the competing songs for the 2014 contest had been released, the running order for the semi-finals was decided by the shows' producers rather than through another draw, so that similar songs were not placed next to each other. Estonia was set to perform in position 3, following the entry from Latvia and before the entry from Sweden.

The two semi-finals and the final were broadcast in Estonia on ETV with commentary by Marko Reikop. The first semi-final and final were also broadcast via radio on Raadio 2 with commentary by Mart Juur and Andrus Kivirähk. The Estonian spokesperson, who announced the Estonian votes during the final, was Lauri Pihlap who had previously represented Estonia in the Eurovision Song Contest in 2001 as member of 2XL.

Semi-final 
Tanja took part in technical rehearsals on 28 April and 2 May, followed by dress rehearsals on 5 and 6 May. This included the jury show on 5 May where the professional juries of each country watched and voted on the competing entries.

The Estonian performance featured Tanja performing a contemporary dance choreography on stage in a white dress together with dancer Argo Liik. The stage LED screens transitioned from projections of wooden floors, which Tanja and Liik lied on at the beginning of the performance, and wooden window frames with brick finishes to flying birds and moving lines. Tanja was also joined by three backing vocalists: Kaire Vilgats, Marvi Vallaste and Marilin Kongo.

At the end of the show, Estonia was not announced among the top 10 entries in the first semi-final and therefore failed to qualify to compete in the final. It was later revealed that Estonia placed 12th in the semi-final, receiving a total of 36 points.

Voting 
Voting during the three shows consisted of 50 percent public televoting and 50 percent from a jury deliberation. The jury consisted of five music industry professionals who were citizens of the country they represent, with their names published before the contest to ensure transparency. This jury was asked to judge each contestant based on: vocal capacity; the stage performance; the song's composition and originality; and the overall impression by the act. In addition, no member of a national jury could be related in any way to any of the competing acts in such a way that they cannot vote impartially and independently. The individual rankings of each jury member were released shortly after the grand final.

Following the release of the full split voting by the EBU after the conclusion of the competition, it was revealed that Estonia had placed sixteenth (last) with the public televote and tenth with the jury vote in the first semi-final. In the public vote, Estonia scored 13 points, while with the jury vote, Estonia scored 61 points.

Below is a breakdown of points awarded to Estonia and awarded by Estonia in the first semi-final and grand final of the contest, and the breakdown of the jury voting and televoting conducted during the two shows:

Points awarded to Estonia

Points awarded by Estonia

Detailed voting results
The following members comprised the Estonian jury:
 Laura Remmel (jury chairperson)singer, represented Estonia in the 2005 contest as member of Suntribe
 Marju Läniksinger
 Rauno MärksDJ, radio host
 Alar Kotkasmusic producer, songwriter
 Rasmus Rändveesinger

References

2014
Countries in the Eurovision Song Contest 2014
Eurovision
Articles containing video clips